A charter is the grant of authority or rights. Charter may also refer to:

Brands and enterprises
 Charter Arms (1964), an American manufacturer of revolvers
 Charter Communications (1993), a large American cable television, Internet and phone company
 Charter Company (1949–1999), a very large, defunct conglomerate that had more than 180 subsidiaries
 Charter International (1889–2012), a large British engineering business, acquired by Colfax Corporation in 2012

Contracts, governing documents and official designations
 Congressional charter, symbolic charters issued by the United States Congress from 1791 to 1992
 Graphic charter, the rules about the graphic identity of an organisation
 Project charter, a statement of the scope, objectives and participants in a project
 University charter
 Municipal charter
 Charter school, a school that operates independently of the local public school system
 Charter city, form of legal municipal structure
 Charter (New York), a grant of authority or rights issued by the New York State Education Department
 Charter township, township with village-like powers in Michigan

Specific charters
 Canadian Charter of Rights and Freedoms, a bill of rights entrenched in the Constitution of Canada
 United Nations Charter, a statement of the scope, objectives of united nations
 Charter of the Rights of the Family (aka "The Charter" / "La Carta"), Catholic Church

Transportation
 Air charter, the renting of an entire plane, as opposed to just seats on a flight 
 Bareboat charter, a type of boat chartering whereby no crew or provisions are included
 Yacht charter, the practice of renting a sailboat or motor yacht and travelling to various destinations
 The renting of an entire train, as an excursion train, or a city bus or tram

Other uses
 Charters (surname)
 Andrew Charter, field hockey player
 Charter (typeface), a serif typeface designed for Bitstream Inc. by Matthew Carter in 1987
 Charter (film), a 2020 Swedish film

See also
Chartered (disambiguation)
Charterhouse (disambiguation)
Chartering (disambiguation)
Charthouse